The Red Dance (also known as The Red Dancer of Moscow) is a 1928 American film directed by Raoul Walsh and starring Dolores del Río and Charles Farrell that was inspired in the novel by Henry Leyford Gates. Although silent, it was released with synchronized music and sound effects.

Plot
Tasia (Dolores del Río), a beautiful lower class dancer from Russia, falls for the heir to the throne Prince, Grand Duke Eugene (Charles Farrell), but only admires him from a distance. At the outbreak of the Russian Revolution, the Duke falls in captivity and this allows Tasia be near him.

Cast
Dolores del Río as Tasia
Charles Farrell as Grand Duke Eugene
Ivan Linow as Ivan Petroff
Boris Charsky as An agitator
Dorothy Revier as Princess Varvara
Andrés de Segurola as General Tanaroff
Demetrius Alexis as Rasputin
Henry Armetta as Prisoner (uncredited)
Nigel De Brulier as Bishop (uncredited)
Soledad Jiménez as Tasia's Mother (uncredited)
Muriel McCormac as Tasia as a child (uncredited)
Barry Norton as Rasputin's Assassin (uncredited)
Magda Sonja as Undetermined Role (uncredited)

Critical reception
"There is a good deal of lethargy about the opening chapters of this offering, but interest picks up in the latter passages", wrote Mordaunt Hall of The New York Times. "There are some good scenes in this somewhat wild piece of work, but it is often incoherent." Variety singled out Ivan Linow's performance for praise and reported that the scenes of the uprising were successful, but "otherwise there wasn't much to direct in this story except to keep it going." Oliver Claxton of The New Yorker panned the film, writing, "how anybody with the slightest modicum of intelligence could fashion such a tale is beyond me....a little criticism would shoot the film so full of holes that it would resemble a Swiss cheese without the cheese. The odor, I am afraid, would still remain."

References

External links

Lobby poster
Stills at silenthollywood.com

1928 films
American silent feature films
American black-and-white films
Films directed by Raoul Walsh
American romantic drama films
Fox Film films
1928 romantic drama films
1920s English-language films
1920s American films
Silent romantic drama films
Silent American drama films